Kilmessan is a village in County Meath, Ireland. It is situated 10/15 minutes away from Dunshaughlin, Trim and Navan, 6 km from the M3 motorway. The village has a primary school, shop, post office and several pubs. The Station House Hotel is located in Kilmessan.

Sport
Kilmessan GAA club plays hurling. They are the most successful hurling club in Meath having won the Meath championship 29 times. The Kilmessan men won the Leinster Intermediate Championship in 2008 and lost out on reaching the All-Ireland final after losing the semi-final after extra-time. Kilmessan also have a Camogie club. Kilmessan became All-Ireland junior club champions in 2014 and again in 2017. In 2013 the village completed a "double", when both the senior hurling and senior camogie succeed within the county to gain the title of county champions within the same weekend.

Kilmessan Bowls Club is affiliated to the Irish Indoor Bowling Association (IIBA).

References

Towns and villages in County Meath